Moisés Alejandro Avila Mena (born April 13, 1974) is a Chilean former footballer who had a long career in domestic football.

Titles
 Colo-Colo 1996 (Chilean Primera División Championship and Copa Chile)
 Santiago Morning 2005 (Chilean Primera B Championship)

References
 

1974 births
Living people
Chilean footballers
Colo-Colo footballers
Audax Italiano footballers
Unión Española footballers
Santiago Morning footballers
Universidad de Chile footballers
Everton de Viña del Mar footballers
O'Higgins F.C. footballers
Santiago Wanderers footballers
Chilean Primera División players
Primera B de Chile players
Association football midfielders
Doping cases in association football